Zippo Pine Bar (1969-1998) is the leading Western Pleasure sire of Quarter Horses.

Life

Zippo Pine Bar was a 1969 sorrel son of Zippo Pat Bars out of Dollie Pine, a daughter of Poco Pine. Poco Pine was a son of Poco Bueno. Dollie Pine's dam was a descendant of Joe Moore, a half brother to Joe Reed P-3 and himself a descendant of Traveler. Norman Reynolds bought Zippo Pine Bar as a weanling at Lloyd Geweke's dispersal sale in 1969, hoping for a halter horse.

Show career 
During his show career, he earned from the American Quarter Horse Association an AQHA Championship, as well as a Performance Register of Merit and a Superior Western Pleasure Horse Award. He was the 1972 AQHA High Point Junior Western Pleasure Stallion and the 1972 AQHA High Point Junior Western Riding Horse.<ref name=Legends4>Close Legends 4 p. 174-189</ref> In 1992, he was inducted into the National Snaffle Bit Association Hall of Fame.

 Breeding record 
He sired 1648 Quarter horse foals, 68 Appaloosas, and 72 Paints which collectively have earned over 50,000 show points. Five of his offspring have been inducted into the NSBA Hall of Fame — Mr Zippo Pine, Zippo By Moonlight, Zips Chocolate Chip, Zippos Mr Goodbar, and Zippos Amblin Easy. His son Zippos Mr Good Bar also was inducted into the AQHA Hall of Fame in 2019. In 2000, Zippos Mr Good Bar was inducted as well into the National Snaffle Bit Association Hall of Fame.

Others of his influential offspring include Melody Zipper, Flashy Zipper, Zippo Cash Bar, Zippo Jack Bar, Zippos Honeybee and Don't Skip Zip. In 1991 his offspring won World Championships in Western Pleasure in the AQHA, the American Paint Horse Association (or APHA) and the Appaloosa Horse Club (or ApHC).

 Death and honors 
He was euthanized on January 12, 1998 at age 29 following a major stroke.

He was inducted into the AQHA Hall of Fame in 2000.

Pedigree

See also
 List of individual horses

Notes

References
 All Breed Pedigree Database Pedigree of Zippo Pine Bar accessed on June 22, 2007
 - Zippo Pine Bar accessed on September 2, 2017
 AQHA Hall of Fame accessed on September 2, 2017
 Close, Pat and Roy Jo Sartin, ed. Legends 4: Outstanding Quarter Horse Stallions and Mares Colorado Springs:Western Horseman 2002 
 Ehringer, Gavin "Living Legends: Zippo Pine Bars" Horse & Rider p. 38-41
 NSBA Hall of Fame accessed on July 5, 2007
 Pitzer, Andrea Laycock The Most Influential Quarter Horse Sires'' Tacoma, Washington:Premier Publishing 1987

External links
 Zippo Pine Bar at Quarter Horse Directory
 Zippo Pine Bar Information
 Zippo Pine Bar at Quarter Horse Legends

American Quarter Horse show horses
American Quarter Horse sires
1969 animal births
1998 animal deaths
AQHA Hall of Fame (horses)